is the seventh live video album by Japanese band Wagakki Band, released on December 9, 2020 by Universal Music Japan in four editions: DVD, Blu-ray, Live CD Edition DVD, and Live CD Edition Blu-ray with 60-page photo book. The video covers the band's concert at the Yokohama Arena on August 15, 2020.

The video peaked at No. 6 on Oricon's DVD chart and No. 4 on Oricon's Blu-ray chart.

Track listing
All tracks are arranged by Wagakki Band.

Personnel 
 Yuko Suzuhana – vocals
 Machiya – guitar
 Beni Ninagawa – tsugaru shamisen
 Kiyoshi Ibukuro – koto
 Asa – bass
 Daisuke Kaminaga – shakuhachi
 Wasabi – drums
 Kurona – wadaiko

Charts

References

External links 
 
  (Universal Music Japan)

Wagakki Band video albums
2020 live albums
Japanese-language live albums
Universal Music Japan video albums
Albums recorded at the Yokohama Arena